Talanites is a genus of ground spiders that was first described by Eugène Simon in 1893.

Species
 it contains fifteen species:
Talanites atscharicus Mcheidze, 1946 – Georgia, Kazakhstan
Talanites captiosus (Gertsch & Davis, 1936) – Southern Texas, Mexico
Talanites cavernicola Thorell, 1897 – Myanmar
Talanites dunini Platnick & Ovtsharenko, 1991 – Israel, Central Asia
Talanites echinus (Chamberlin, 1922) – Southeastern United States
Talanites exlineae (Platnick & Shadab, 1976) – Southeastern United States
Talanites fagei Spassky, 1938 – Azerbaijan, Russia (Europe) to Central Asia
Talanites fervidus Simon, 1893 (type) – Egypt, Israel
Talanites mikhailovi Platnick & Ovtsharenko, 1991 – Kazakhstan
Talanites moodyae Platnick & Ovtsharenko, 1991 – California
Talanites ornatus (O. Pickard-Cambridge, 1874) – Egypt
Talanites santschii Dalmas, 1918 – Tunisia
Talanites strandi Spassky, 1940 – Ukraine, Russia (Europe), Kazakhstan
Talanites tibialis Caporiacco, 1934 – India, Pakistan
Talanites ubicki Platnick & Ovtsharenko, 1991 – California

References

Araneomorphae genera
Gnaphosidae
Spiders of Africa
Spiders of Asia
Spiders of North America
Taxa named by Eugène Simon